Jason Burik is an American Lego artist who builds custom replica models with interlocking plastic bricks. He has received numerous commissions from professional sports teams, colleges, companies, and individuals all over the United States.

Born in Pittsburgh, Pennsylvania, Burik has been building Lego blocks since the age of seven.  He turned his long-time hobby into a business while he was in college. He played Division I basketball for the University of Maryland, Baltimore County. His first project was a replica model of his parents' house.  After working on many different types of projects, the next progression was to teach Lego building skills to others.  Thus began the concept of Burik's Lego camps.

Burik is an elementary school principal in the Montour School District.  He used to be an assistant superintendent and a teacher who taught sixth-grade Math, Science, Social Studies, and English at David E. Williams Middle School in Kennedy Township. He was co-creator of the world's first Brick Makerspace powered by Lego education.

His work can be seen at the following locations:
UPMC Children's Hospital of Pittsburgh
HobbyTown USA in Robinson Twp, Pennsylvania
Bellaire Historic Society and Toy Museum in Bellaire, Ohio
PNC Park (Pittsburgh Pirates) in Pittsburgh, Pennsylvania
University of Maryland Baltimore County, in Baltimore, Maryland
Panorama Towers in Las Vegas, Nevada
 
Some of Burik's notable projects include: NCAA Final 4 Logos, Heinz Field, PNC Park, Camden Yards, Cal Ripken Sr. Yard, Yankee Stadium, Bryant–Denny Stadium, Raven's Stadium, Citizens Bank Park, the City of Pittsburgh, The Pittsburgh Children's Museum, the Pittsburgh Convention Center, the U.S. Capitol, the Empire State Building, St. Peter's Church, Wedding Cake Topper, Globe, and replicas of people's homes.

Burik has received numerous awards for his work. He has been interviewed for television by KDKA-TV (Pittsburgh), WTAE-TV (Pittsburgh), WQED (Pittsburgh), and WJZ (Baltimore).  Her had been featured in newspaper articles in the Pittsburgh Post-Gazette, Pittsburgh Tribune-Review, The Baltimore Sun, The Philadelphia Inquirer, and Pittsburgh Magazine.  His website took first place in the Allegheny County Greater Fair Website Competition.  He is a member of Steel City LUG], a Lego User Group for Adult Fans of Lego (AFOLs) in Pittsburgh and Western Pennsylvania.

References

https://triblive.com/local/allegheny/14096102-74/montour-elementary-kids-make-giant-terrible-towel-out-of-legos

https://pittsburgh.cbslocal.com/2018/09/22/stem-fest-lego-terrible-towel/

External links
www.brickmodeldesign.com

Year of birth missing (living people)
Living people
Artists from Pennsylvania